The copyright status of The Wizard of Oz and related works in the United States is complicated for several reasons.  The book series is very long-running, and written by multiple authors, so the books often fall on opposite sides of eligibility for copyright laws.  There have also been multiple adaptations across many different media, which enjoy different kinds of copyright protection.  The copyright law of the United States has changed many times, and impacted Oz works every time.  , twenty-eight Oz books and five films are in the public domain.  Starting in 2019, an Oz book has entered the public domain every year.  Barring another extension of copyright terms, all of the Famous Forty will be in the public domain by 2059.

Books

L. Frank Baum
When L. Frank Baum began publishing the Oz books, the copyright law in effect was the Copyright Act of 1831, which provided a 28-year term with a possible fourteen more years upon renewal of the copyright.  However, the Copyright Act of 1909 retroactively affected Baum's books, allowing a 28-year renewal for fifty-six total years of copyright protection.  The L. Frank Baum Trust renewed the copyright on all of Baum's Oz novels.

The Wonderful Wizard of Oz was published in 1900, and was the first to enter the public domain in 1956.  This allowed Reilly & Lee, the publisher of all the other Oz books (as well as Baum's other books) to issue their own edition of The Wizard of Oz, which had previously been published by George M. Hill Company and later by the Bobbs-Merrill Company after Hill went bankrupt.

The Marvelous Land of Oz, which was published in 1904, followed suit and entered public domain in 1960.

All of Baum's subsequent Oz books, published between 1907 and 1920, had their copyright extended by subsequent laws.  Between 1962 and 1974, Congress passed nine copyright acts extending the copyright one or two years each time (these acts also introduced the rule that rounds the copyright term up to the end of that calendar year).  This ensured that all works published after September 1906 (and renewed as necessary) stayed copyrighted until the Copyright Act of 1976 took effect. The 1976 Act extended the renewal to 47 years, meaning works could stay copyrighted for 75 years after publication.  Thus, the rest of Baum's Oz books did not enter public domain until the 75-year terms was up.  Ozma of Oz (published in 1907) was the first to enter the public domain in 1983, and the subsequent books followed, with Glinda of Oz (published in 1920) finally entering the public domain in 1996.

This accounts for all of the apocryphal Oz books that sprang forth in the 1980s; once more Oz books entered the public domain, it allowed other authors to utilize those elements in their own works.

All of Baum's other works—non-Oz books, plays, and musicals—are also in the public domain, and have been since 1995 at the latest.

Ruth Plumly Thompson
The first two books written by Ruth Plumly Thompson, The Royal Book of Oz (published in 1921) and Kabumpo in Oz (published 1922), entered the public domain 75 years later (1997 and 1998, respectively) pursuant to the Copyright Act of 1976.
The next twelve books (The Cowardly Lion of Oz through Speedy in Oz, published between 1923 and 1934) were still copyrighted when the 1998 Sonny Bono Act extended the copyright term a further twenty years, meaning works would now be copyrighted for 95 years.  These twelve books of Thompson's therefore did not begin to enter the public domain until 2019, with The Cowardly Lion of Oz coming first and Grampa in Oz following in 2020, The Lost King of Oz in 2021, and The Hungry Tiger of Oz in 2022. By 2030, all of them will be in the public domain.

Thompson did not renew the copyright on her last five canonical books: The Wishing Horse of Oz, Captain Salt in Oz, Handy Mandy in Oz, The Silver Princess in Oz, and Ozoplaning with the Wizard of Oz. Thus, these books entered the public domain 28 years after publication, between 1963 and 1967.
Congress amended the copyright law in 1992 so there would subsequently be automatic renewals of copyright.  Therefore, the copyright on Thompson's deutero-canonical books Yankee in Oz (published in 1972) and The Enchanted Island of Oz (published in 1976) will not expire until 2068 and 2072 respectively.

John R. Neill
John R. Neill's three canonical Oz books—The Wonder City of Oz, The Scalawagons of Oz, and Lucky Bucky in Oz—were published between 1940 and 1942.  Neill's heirs renewed the copyrights, so these books will not enter the public domain until 2036 through 2038, pursuant to the 95-year term. A fourth Oz book by Neill—The Runaway in Oz—was written by Neill in 1943. It was published posthumously in 1995.It was edited,expanded and illustrated by Eric Shanower,so The Runaway in Oz will enter the public domain 70 years after the death of the last surviving author.Since Eric Shanower is still alive,The Runaway in Oz will remain copyrighted until at least 2094.

Jack Snow
Snow published two canonical Oz books: The Magical Mimics in Oz in 1946, and The Shaggy Man of Oz in 1949.  The copyright was never renewed on either of these, so they entered the public domain in 1974 and 1977, respectively.  They are the last two Oz books that entered the public domain.

Rachel Cosgrove
The Hidden Valley of Oz was published by Rachel Cosgrove in 1951, had the copyright renewed, and therefore will enter public domain in 2047.

Cosgrove also wrote The Wicked Witch of Oz in 1954.  However, it was not published until 1993.  Since it was published after 1977, it will remain copyrighted for seventy years after the author's death.  Cosgrove died in 1998, so The Wicked Witch of Oz will enter public domain in 2069.

Eloise Jarvis McGraw and Lauren Lynn McGraw
The McGraws' canonical book, Merry Go Round in Oz, was published in 1963.The copyright was renewed, so it will enter the public domain in 2059.  It will be the last book in the Famous Forty to enter the public domain.

The McGraws co-wrote another Oz book, The Forbidden Fountain of Oz, which was published in 1980.  Its copyright lasts for seventy years after the death of last living author. Lauren McGraw is still alive, so The Forbidden Fountain of Oz will enter the public domain seventy years after her death.  Since it will remain copyrighted until at least 2094, it will be the last deutero-canonical work to enter the public domain.

Eloise McGraw wrote The Rundelstone of Oz by herself, and it was published posthumously in 2001.  Since Eloise McGraw died in 2000, it will enter the public domain in 2071.
All other Oz books (with the exception of the special cases listed below) are still copyrighted under the current laws of 70 years after author's death.Please note that the illustrations and the cover art are considered separate works from the text,so they may enter the public domain at a different date.

Table of canonical and deutero-canonical Oz books

Infringements on the Oz books

Frank Baum
Baum's son, Frank Joslyn Baum, wrote his own Oz story – The Laughing Dragon of Oz.  He tried to get it published by Reilly & Lee, but they refused, and he published it with Whitman Publishing Company in 1934.  This was an infringing work at the time – all of the Oz books were still copyrighted, and the rights were held by Frank Baum's mother, Maud Gage Baum.
Both Maud Baum and Reilly & Lee sued Frank Baum and Whitman Publishing.  The case was settled and The Laughing Dragon stayed out of print until 2006.  However, its copyright was renewed in 1962, so it will remain copyrighted until 2030, per the 95-year term.
The Laughing Dragon of Oz was the first high-profile case of infringement on the Oz books, and it would be the first of many.

Alexander Volkov
Alexander Volkov's six Oz books were published in the Soviet Union, so they are subject to Russian copyright law.  The first book – The Wizard of the Emerald City – was published in 1939, when The Wizard of Oz was still copyrighted.  The Wizard of the Emerald City is an adaptation of The Wizard of Oz, borrowing liberally from the original book without even crediting Baum.
The subsequent four books were published between 1963 and 1970, and the last one – The Secret of the Deserted Castle – was published in 1982.  At the time of publication, The Wizard of Oz and The Land of Oz were in the public domain, but the other Oz books were still copyrighted.  However, Volkov's books are mostly original sequels to The Wizard of the Emerald City, so whether they are infringing or not is difficult to say.  Barely any of the elements from later Oz books are featured in Volkov's works, so most likely they were not infringing.

The Soviet Union did not have international copyright relations until 1973, when it joined the 1971 Paris version of the Universal Copyright Convention.  This meant that when The Secret of the Deserted Castle was published in 1982, it was automatically copyrighted in the United States.  However, the UCC did not work retroactively, so Volkov's first five works were not copyrighted in the US.

Russia joined the Berne convention in 1995, which ensured that the US and Russia (and all other member countries) had to retroactively recognize all existing copyrights in the opposite countries.  That included Volkov's first five books, which were now copyrighted under US law.

The copyright lasts for seventy years after the author's death in Russia, as of a 2004 amendment.  Volkov died in 1977, so all of his books will enter the public domain in 2048.  In the meantime, other Russian authors are continuing Volkov's Oz series, much as American authors posthumously continued Baum's series.  Volkov's works received faithful and legitimate English translations by Peter Blystone in 1991, 1993, and 2007.

March Laumer
March Laumer infringed on both American and Russian Oz writers, though he never saw any repercussions because his works were not considered significant enough to fight.  He published Oz books between 1978 and 1999, but incorporated elements from all the preceding Oz writers, most of whose works were still copyrighted.

He collaborated with Chris Dulabone to release an English translation of The Yellow Fog in 1986.  The two writers then adapted The Seven Underground Kings into The Underground Kings of Oz in 1993.  Both of these works, while clearly infringing on Volkov's works, were legal in the US at the time.  This preceded Russia's accession to the Berne convention, and the US did not recognize the copyright on any Russian work published before 1973 (The Yellow Fog and The Seven Underground Kings were published in 1970 and 1964, respectively).

Feature film adaptations

Silent Oz films
The copyright on the 1910 film entered public domain in 1938. Baum's Oz Film Manufacturing Company films entered public domain in 1942. The 1925 Larry Semon film version of The Wizard of Oz entered the public domain in 1954.  These films remain the only Oz live-action films in the public domain.

1939 film
The 1939 version of The Wizard of Oz is the most well-known adaptation of The Wizard of Oz; in many respects, its popularity surpassed the original book.  Its copyright was renewed in 1967, so it will remain copyrighted for a 95-year term, entering the public domain in 2035.  This has caused issues for most subsequent Oz adaptations, especially because WB/Turner Entertainment Co. (the current owners of the copyright), have been very aggressive in protecting the film's copyright.  Recently, they went after potential merchandise for 2013's Legends of Oz: Dorothy's Return.

In a landmark case,  WB v. AVELA (2011), the US Eighth Circuit ruled that any visual depictions and aspects of characters in public domain developed solely for copyrighted films are under copyright protection. This was significant, because the film is not a particularly faithful adaptation of the book, so much of it is still protected.  (In the case, AVELA was utilizing the promotional materials for the film, and the court ruled that those images are not copyrighted and therefore may be used, but only those exact images may be used.)

Journey Back to Oz
Journey Back to Oz was a 1974 animated film that served as an official sequel to the 1939 film, as well as a very loose adaptation of The Land of Oz (which was in public domain by then).  It is just about the only film that could borrow from the 1939 film without issue.  It was copyrighted in 1971 as it was nearing completion.

Return to Oz
The 1985 film Return to Oz was based on The Land of Oz and Ozma of Oz.  Disney owned the rights to adapt all of Baum's books except The Wizard of Oz, but this did not matter because by 1985 both The Marvelous Land of Oz and Ozma of Oz were in the public domain.

The only element that Return to Oz used from the 1939 film was the ruby slippers – in the book, there were silver shoes.  The ruby slippers had become so iconic due to the MGM film, Disney paid handsomely for the rights to use them.

Oz the Great and Powerful
The 2013 film Oz the Great and Powerful was technically a prequel to the 1939 film, but it was not allowed to be considered as such.  The filmmakers had to toe a fine line between calling the film to mind but not infringing on it.  To that end, they had a copyright expert on set to ensure that no infringement occurred.

The copyright expert had to make sure that the Wicked Witch's shade of green was distinct enough from Margaret Hamilton's shade of green.  The expert also ensured that the Emerald City was not too close in appearance to the Emerald City in the 1939 film.

While WB and Disney did not engage in a copyright battle, they did file rival trademarks.  Disney filed a trademark on "Oz the Great and Powerful."  One week later, WB filed its own trademark for "The Great and Powerful Oz."  The US Patent and Trademark Office suspended WB's attempt at a trademark because Disney had filed basically the same one a week earlier.

The Wicked Witch of the West
The Wicked Witch of the West is one of the most iconic villains of modern times.  The iconic version of the Wicked Witch is Margaret Hamilton's portrayal in the 1939 film, which is copyrighted.  The character of the Wicked Witch from the book is in public domain, but that version of the Wicked Witch is not even green.  Most modern portrayals of the Wicked Witch of the West do make her green, because that is how the public thinks of the Wicked Witch, but they all strive to make her appearance somehow distinctive.
The Wicked Witch is not given a name in the books, so subsequent authors gave her their own names.  All of these names are protected under copyright as part of their respective works, which means new creators have to keep coming up with their own version.  Some of the most well-known incarnations of the Wicked Witch of the West are "Elphaba" (Wicked), "Theodora" (Oz the Great and Powerful), "Zelena" (Once Upon a Time), "Evillene" (The Wiz), and "Azkadellia" (Tin Man).
There are similar issues regarding portrayals of the Wicked Witch of the East, but she is not as prevalent in the public consciousness as her Western sister.

Notes

References
US Copyright Office, Library of Congress.  The Catalog of Copyright Entries.  The Online Books Page
Peter B. Hirtle, "Copyright Term and Public Domain in the United States", Cornell Copyright Information Center, January 3, 2014

Oz (franchise)
United States copyright law
Public domain